Jorge Antonio Battaglia Méndez (born 12 January 1960) is a Paraguayan former football goalkeeper. He played his club football for Sol de América, Olimpia Asunción, Club Bolívar and Estudiantes de La Plata.

Battaglia was also part of the Paraguay national football team that participated in the 1986 FIFA World Cup, where he was the substitute of starting goalkeeper Roberto Fernández.

External links

1960 births
Living people
Association football goalkeepers
Paraguayan footballers
Club Sol de América footballers
Club Olimpia footballers
Club Bolívar players
Estudiantes de La Plata footballers
Club Alianza Lima footballers
Independiente Medellín footballers
Paraguayan Primera División players
Argentine Primera División players
Categoría Primera A players
1986 FIFA World Cup players
Paraguayan expatriate footballers
Paraguay international footballers
Expatriate footballers in Argentina
Expatriate footballers in Bolivia
Expatriate footballers in Colombia
Expatriate footballers in Peru
1995 Copa América players
Paraguayan expatriate sportspeople in Argentina
Paraguayan expatriate sportspeople in Bolivia
Paraguayan expatriate sportspeople in Colombia
Paraguayan people of Italian descent
Sportspeople from Asunción